Steve Blair (born 28 December 1961) is an Australian former soccer player who played for South Melbourne in the National Soccer League (NSL) and played 13 times for the Australia national soccer team.

References

Living people
1956 births
Australia international soccer players
National Soccer League (Australia) players
Soccer players from Sydney
Eastern Sports Club footballers
Marconi Stallions FC players
Expatriate footballers in Hong Kong
Association football defenders
Australian soccer players
1980 Oceania Cup players